Idlewood may refer to:

The former name of Evanston, Cincinnati, a neighborhood in Ohio
Idlewood, a district of Kitchener, Ontario
The former name of the City of University Heights, Ohio
Idlewood station, an elevated busway station in Pittsburgh, Pennsylvania